Komplottet ('The Ploy') was a Norwegian television show that aired on TV3 from 1996 to 1998 and in a revived version in 2003. The host from 1996 to 1999 was Leif Erik Forberg, and the host in 2003 was Åsleik Engmark.

Komplottet was a hidden camera show where the celebrities are the victims. The show is considered TV3's most successful Norwegian production.

External links
Ulovlig avlyttet (Norwegian)

References

TV3 (Norway) original programming
Norwegian reality television series
1996 Norwegian television series debuts
2003 Norwegian television series endings
1990s Norwegian television series
2000s Norwegian television series